Suresh Kumar Kashyap' is an Indian politician and President of Himachal Pradesh State Unit of Bharatiya Janata Party.

 Early life 
Suresh Kr. Kashyap was born into a Koli family to Chambel Singh Kashyap and Shanti Devi at Sirmour, Himachal Pradesh.

He did graduation from Kurukshetra University, M.A in Tourism Management from IGNOU and PGDM in Public Relation & Communication Management from Maharshi Dayananad Saraswati University (Ajmer), then B.Ed. and MPhil in Public Administration from Himachal Pradesh University.

In 1988, he joined Indian Air Force as airman (non-commissioned officer'') and got retired in 2004.

Political career 

He started his career as member of BDC (Pachhad) joined BJP and later became Distt. President of BJP SC Morcha. In 2009 he was State General Secretary of BJP SC Morcha.

He became Member of Himachal Pradesh Legislative Assembly from Pachhad constituency in 2012 and got re-elected in 2017 from same constituency.

In 2019 Lok Sabha elections he became Member of Parliament from Shimla constituency. He served as member of parliamentary committees -
Member of Standing Committee on Personnel, Public Grievances, Law and Justice.
Member of Committee on Absence of Members from the Sittings of the House.
Member of Committee on External Affairs.
Member of Consulatitve Committee for Ministry of Food Processing Industries.

On 22 July 2020 he became President of Himachal Pradesh State Unit of Bharatiya Janata Party.

References

India MPs 2019–present
Lok Sabha members from Himachal Pradesh
Living people
Bharatiya Janata Party politicians from Himachal Pradesh
People from Shimla
1971 births
Koli people